Team Facelift was an American hip hop group based in New York City that signed with Duck Down Records.

History
The group was founded in 2004 and consisted of its three MCs—Machine, the Fat Jew, Alden Fonda—and one producer, Tommy Mas. The three met at Skidmore College in Saratoga Springs, NY. The group's sound was described by the New York Post as a cross between Barbra Streisand and Wu-Tang Clan.

The group first gained national attention when headlining MTV's 52/52 campaign, which featured artists in short interstitials during commercial breaks. Team Facelift was the only group to appear that was unsigned.

Art direction

Team Facelift is known for its bizarre stage theatrics and antics, such as the use of pyrotechnics and live animals (particularly doves). The Fat Jew is famous for his on-stage nudity, often performing in nothing but a thong and construction boots.

The group's first album, Mixed Emotions, was released in December 2006 on its independent label, Facelift Records. The group's newest project, currently untitled, will be released in fall 2010 on Duck Down Records. In early May, it was announced that renowned house-music remixer, producer, and DJ Junior Sanchez will be executive producer of the album. In late 2008 the group was featured on the single "Shake That Ass" on famed producer Armand Van Helden's New York: a Mix Odyssey 2 album.

Executive producers for the popular show The Daily 10 on the E! Entertainment channel selected Team Facelift to become the New York bureau of that show, conducting man-on-the-street, public-opinion, and one-on-one interviews of the New York City entertainment scene, while adding [its] unique brand of color and humor to the segment.

In fall 2009, Team Facelift and Red Bull North America partnered together for Band on the Run, a unique tour that consisted of surprise performances from Team Facelift at major Colleges and Universities in the Northeast and Mid-Atlantic regions of the US.

In 2010 the group parted ways, citing "creative differences".

Discography

Albums
 Mixed Emotions (2006)

Mixtapes
 Famous In Japan (2003)
 Mixtape Vol. I (2005)
 Fancy/Sleazy (2007)
 Passion Cove (2008)
 6 Grams (2010)

References

External links
 Official site

American hip hop groups
Jewish hip hop groups
Musical groups established in 2004
Musical groups from New York City